Falguni Sanjay Nayar (born 19 February 1963) is an Indian billionaire businesswoman, who is the founder and CEO of the beauty and lifestyle retail company Nykaa, formally known as FSN E-Commerce Ventures which is an acronym of her own name. Nayar is one of two self-made female Indian billionaires.

Early life and education 
Nayar was born and raised in a Gujarati family in Mumbai, Maharashtra. Her father was a businessman and ran a small bearings company, assisted by her mother. She is a graduate in B.Com from Sydenham College of Commerce and Economics and a postgraduate from the Indian Institute of Management Ahmedabad (1985 batch).

Career 
In 1993, Nayar joined Kotak Mahindra Group after leaving her consultant job at A. F. Ferguson & Co. At Kotak Mahindra, she was initially the head of mergers and acquisitions (M&A) team, before going on to open institutional equities offices in London and New York City. In 2001, she returned to India. In 2005, she was appointed as the managing director of Kotak Mahindra Capital, the investment banking unit, and director of Kotak Securities, the institutional equities arm. She quit her job in 2012.

In April 2012, at the age of 50, she founded Nykaa with $2 million of her own money. Nykaa was worth $2.3 billion as of 2021 bringing Nayar's fortune to an estimated $1.1 billion. Nayar is one of 2 self-made female Indian billionaires, the other being Kiran Mazumdar-Shaw. Nykaa listed at $13 billion valuation on 10 November 2021. Soon after Nykaa went public, Nayar became the wealthiest female Indian billionaire, with her net worth rising to the tune of $6.5 billion, and entered the list of top 20 Indians by net worth.
In 2022, Nayar made her debut in the Forbes India Rich List at rank 44.

Personal life 
Falguni Nayar married Sanjay Nayar in the year 1987, whom she met at business school. He is the CEO of Kohlberg Kravis Roberts India. They have two children – Adwaita Nayar and Anchit Nayar, who are twins; Adwaita is the CEO of Nykaa Fashion whereas Anchit heads the retail and e-commerce divisions.

References 

Living people
Indian businesspeople
Indian business executives
1963 births